Angela Walker may refer to:
 Angela Nicole Walker (born 1974), American bus/truck driver, labor organizer, and 2020 Green nominee for Vice President of the United States
 Angela Walker (rhythmic gymnast) (born 1967), New Zealand rhythmic gymnast
 Angela Walker (tennis) (born 1960), Canadian tennis player
 Angela R. Hight Walker, American physicist